Aethes sanguinana is a species of moth of the family Tortricidae. It was described by Treitschke in 1830. It is found in most of southern and central Europe, Morocco, Algeria and Asia Minor.

Adults are on wing from May to July.

The larvae feed on Eryngium campestre. Larvae have been recorded from January to March, in July and from September to December.

References

sanguinana
Moths described in 1830
Moths of Africa
Moths of Europe
Moths of Asia